Walter Gerald Gant (7 July 1890 – 31 May 1957) was an Australian rules footballer who played with St Kilda in the Victorian Football League (VFL).

Notes

External links 

1890 births
1957 deaths
Australian rules footballers from Melbourne
St Kilda Football Club players